Connor Murphy (born March 26, 1993) is an American professional ice hockey defenseman and alternate captain for the Chicago Blackhawks of the National Hockey League. He was selected 20th overall in the 2011 NHL Entry Draft by the Phoenix Coyotes. He is the son of former NHL defenseman Gord Murphy.

Playing career

Amateur
As a youth, Murphy played in the 2006 Quebec International Pee-Wee Hockey Tournament with the Ohio AAA Blue Jackets minor ice hockey team. He later played junior ice hockey with the Sarnia Sting in the Ontario Hockey League. Prior to signing with the Sting, Murphy committed to Miami University, but decided to play in the Ontario Hockey League for the Sarnia Sting instead. Murphy has previously played for the USA Hockey National Team Development Program of the United States Hockey League (USHL).

Phoenix Coyotes organization
On November 16, 2013, Connor made his NHL debut with the Phoenix Coyotes, and in his first NHL game he scored his first NHL goal past Tampa Bay Lightning goalie Anders Lindback.

On July 28, 2016, Murphy signed a six-year, $23.1 million contract with the Coyotes.

Chicago Blackhawks
After his fourth season with the Coyotes, Murphy and Laurent Dauphin were traded to the Chicago Blackhawks in exchange for Niklas Hjalmarsson on June 23, 2017.

On August 31, 2021, Murphy signed a four-year, $17.6 million contract extension with the Blackhawks.

International play

Murphy represented the United States internationally playing for Team USA in the 2011 IIHF World U18 Championships with Team USA. He scored 3 goals and had 1 assists in 6 games during the tournament, including the overtime goal in the gold medal game against Sweden. He was selected as captain for the 2017 IIHF World Championship, leading Team USA to a 5th-place finish.

Personal life
Murphy was born in Boston when his father, Gord Murphy, was a member of the Boston Bruins. He grew up in the suburbs of Miami and Atlanta before his family settled in Dublin, Ohio, when his father was an assistant coach with the Columbus Blue Jackets. He has a brother named Tyler and a sister named Lexi.

Career statistics

Regular season and playoffs

International

References

External links
 

1993 births
Living people
American men's ice hockey defensemen
Arizona Coyotes draft picks
Arizona Coyotes players
Chicago Blackhawks players
Ice hockey players from Ohio
National Hockey League first-round draft picks
People from Dublin, Ohio
Phoenix Coyotes players
Portland Pirates players
Sarnia Sting players
USA Hockey National Team Development Program players